TRANSform Me is an American reality television series that premiered March 15, 2010, on VH1. The series shows a cisgender female contestant as she is given an internal and external makeover by a team of three trans women stylists. Laverne Cox produced and starred in TRANSform Me, making her the first African-American trans woman to produce and star in her own TV show.

Episodes

References

External links

2010 American television series debuts
2010 American television series endings
2010s American reality television series
VH1 original programming
English-language television shows
Transgender-related television shows
2010s LGBT-related reality television series
2010s American LGBT-related television series
American LGBT-related reality television series